Catuana spinicornis is a species of beetle in the family Cerambycidae, the only species in the genus Catuana.

References

Acanthoderini